Psygnosis Limited (known as SCE Studio Liverpool or simply Studio Liverpool from 1999) was a British video game developer and publisher headquartered at Wavertree Technology Park in Liverpool. Founded in 1984 by Ian Hetherington, Jonathan Ellis, and David Lawson, the company initially became known for well-received games on the Atari ST and Amiga. In 1993, it became a wholly owned subsidiary of Sony Computer Entertainment (SCE) and began developing games for the original PlayStation. It later became a part of SCE Worldwide Studios. The company was the oldest and second largest development house within SCE's European stable of developers, and became best known for franchises such as Lemmings, Wipeout, Formula One, and Colony Wars.

Reports of Studio Liverpool's closure surfaced on 22 August 2012, with Edge quoting staff tweets. Staff members were told the news by Michael Denny, vice president of Sony Worldwide Studios Europe. Sony said that the Liverpool site would remain in operation, as it was still home to many Sony Departments. At the time of its closure, it employed roughly 100 people comprising two development teams. Mick Hocking oversaw Studio Liverpool's operations as its last Group Studio Director, a position he continued to hold within Evolution Studios.

Psygnosis still exists as a legal entity under Sony and continues to make legal filings, but has had no developers since 2012. In December 2021, Sony renewed Psygnosis' logo and trademarks despite not using the Psygnosis branding since 2000, though this is thought to be standard filing practice as trademarks last for a decade in the United States and Sony had previously filed renewal applications in 2011 as well.

History

Psygnosis was the eventual successor of the defunct 8-bit software house Imagine Software, where Lawson was one of the founders and Hetherington was financial director. Finchspeed, a company created by the directors, attempted to acquire the assets of the failing company but this was unsuccessful and the remains of Imagine, including their much-hyped but never completed "megagames", were sold by the receivers. While the name and trademarks were bought by Ocean Software, Sinclair Research paid a rumoured £100,000 for the rights to Bandersnatch and contracted a new company set up by Hetherington and Lawson, Fire Iron, to produce the game for the  Sinclair QL for release in early 1985.

Sinclair withdrew funding from Fire Iron in early 1985 and Psygnosis, which became a limited company under United Kingdom company law in July 1985, launched their first title Brataccas, which featured many of the concepts originally intended for Bandersnatch, at the 1985 Personal Computer World show in September.

The name of another Imagine Megagame (the proposed but never developed Psyclapse) was later used by Psygnosis as an alternative label for some of its releases, such as Ballistix and Captain Fizz Meets The Blaster-Trons.

The box artwork was very distinctive with a black background and fantasy artwork by Roger Dean bordered in red. This style was maintained for the better part of 10 years. For the next few years, Psygnosis' releases contained increasingly improved graphics, but were marred by similarly difficult gameplay and control methods. The original company headquarters were located at the Port of Liverpool Building at the Pier Head in Liverpool, but soon moved to Century Buildings in Liverpool's Brunswick Business Park, and later moved down the road to South Harrington Building by the docks.

Although Psygnosis primarily became a game publisher, some games were developed fully or partly in-house. During the early days, artists were employed full-time at the headquarters, offering third-party developers, who were often just single programmers, a high-quality art resource. This allowed Psygnosis to maintain high graphical standards across the board. The original artists were Garvan Corbett, Jeff Bramfitt, Colin Rushby and Jim Bowers, with Neil Thompson joining a little later.

Obliterator, released in 1988, contained an opening animation by Jim Bowers. This short scene would pave the way for increasingly sophisticated intro animations, starting with 2D hand drawn sequences, and progressing into FMV and 3D rendered movies created with Sculpt 4D on the Amiga. Eventually, Psygnosis would buy Silicon Graphics workstations for the sole purpose of creating these animations.

While most game companies of the mid-to-late 1980s (including Psygnosis) were releasing identical games on both the Amiga and Atari ST, Psygnosis started to use the full potential of the Amiga's more powerful hardware to produce technically stunning games, with the landmark title Shadow of the Beast bringing the company its greatest success so far in 1989. Its multi-layered parallax scrolling and music were highly advanced for the time and as such led to the game being used as a showcase demonstration for the Amiga in many computer shops.

Psygnosis consolidated its fame after publishing the DMA Design Lemmings game franchise: debuting in 1991 on the Amiga, Lemmings was ported to a plethora of different computer and video game platforms, generating many sequels and variations of its concept through the years. Microcosm, a game that appeared on the FM Towns, Amiga CD32, and 3DO furthered the company's reputation for games with excellent graphics but limited and poorly designed gameplay.

Psygnosis also created the "Face-Off" games in the Nickelodeon 1992 television game show, Nick Arcade, such as "Post Haste", "Jet Jocks" and "Battle of the Bands".

In 1993 the company was acquired by Sony Electronic Publishing. The acquisition cost Sony £20 million. In preparation for the September 1995 introduction of Sony's PlayStation console in Western markets, Psygnosis started creating games using the PlayStation as primary reference hardware. Among the most famous creations of this period were Wipeout, G-Police, and the Colony Wars series, some of which were ported to PC and to other platforms. The PlayStation marked a turning point in Psygnosis's game design, moving away from the prerendered graphics and limited gameplay that the company had become associated with. This was a successful period for the company; in the 1995-96 financial year, Psygnosis games accounted for 40% of all video games sales in Europe.

The acquisition was rewarding for Sony in another aspect: development kits for PlayStation consoles. As it had previously published PSY-Q development kits for various consoles by SN Systems, Psygnosis arranged for them to create a development system for the PS based on cheap PC hardware. Sony evaluated the system during CES in January 1994 and decided to adopt it.

As Psygnosis expanded after the Sony buyout, another satellite office was opened in Century Building with later offices opening in Stroud, London, Chester, Paris, Germany, and Foster City in California (as the Customer Support & Marketing with software development done in San Francisco), now the home of Sony Computer Entertainment America. The company headquarters has resided at Wavertree Technology Park since 1995.

The Stroud studio was opened in November 1993 in order to attract disgruntled MicroProse employees. Staff grew from initially about 50 to about 70 in 1997. Among the titles created at Stroud are Overboard! and G-Police. The Wheelhouse—its publishing name—was closed in 2000 as part of the Sony Computer Entertainment takeover of Psygnosis. Some members joined Bristol-based Rage Software, but faced a similar demise a number of years later.

Despite being owned by Sony, Psygnosis retained a degree of independence from its parent company during this period and continued to develop and publish titles for other platforms, including the Sega Saturn and the Nintendo 64. This caused friction between Psygnosis and Sony, and in 1996 Sony engaged SBC Warburg's services in finding a buyer for Psygnosis. However, though bids reportedly went as high as $300 million (more than ten times what Sony paid for the company just three years before), after six months Sony rescinded its decision to sell Psygnosis. Relations between the two companies had improved during this time, and Sony became reconciled to Psygnosis releasing games for competing platforms. Shortly after, Psygnosis took over distribution of its own titles, a task that Sony had been handling following the buyout.

As Studio Liverpool

In 1999, a process to consolidate Psygnosis into Sony Computer Entertainment was underway, resulting in the bulk of Psygnosis' sales, marketing and PR staff being made redundant and the development teams reporting directly into Sony Computer Entertainment Europe's president of software development. To reflect this, in 2000, the Psygnosis brand was dropped in favour of SCE Studio Liverpool.

The newly named SCE Studio Liverpool released its first title, Formula One 2001, in 2001. The game was also the studio's first release on the PlayStation 2, and the first entry in the Formula One series after taking over from developer Studio 33. From 2001 to 2007, Studio Liverpool released eight instalments in the series between the PlayStation 2, PlayStation Portable and PlayStation 3. However, Sony Computer Entertainment's exclusive licence with the Formula One Group expired, without renewal, before the 2007 season, marking the end of any further Formula One series instalments from the developer.

Studio Liverpool also created Wipeout Fusion, the first of two instalments of the series on the PlayStation 2, released in 2002. Next they developed Wipeout Pure for the PlayStation Portable, which launched alongside the handheld in 2005 to significant acclaim, with many media outlets heralding it a return to glory for the series. They followed up with the sequel Wipeout Pulse in 2007 which was later ported to the PlayStation 2 and released in Europe.

In 2008 it released Wipeout HD, a downloadable title for the PlayStation 3's PlayStation Network service, consisting of various courses taken from both Wipeout Pure and Wipeout Pulse remade in high definition. An expansion pack for Wipeout HD named Wipeout HD Fury is available at PlayStation Network, including new game modes, new tracks, new music and new ship skins/models. In 2007, a copy of Manhunt 2 was leaked online prior to its release by an employee from the Sony Europe Liverpool office.

On 29 January 2010, Sony made a public statement. The closure of Studio Liverpool was announced on 22 August 2012. In a press release, Sony stated that after an assessment of all European studios, it had decided to close Studio Liverpool. Sony said that the Liverpool site would remain in operation, as it is home to a number of Sony World Wide Studios and SCEE Departments.

Eurogamer was told by an unnamed source that, at the time of its closure, Studio Liverpool was working on two PlayStation 4 launch titles. One was a Wipeout title described as "dramatically different"; the other was a motion capture-based game along the lines of Tom Clancy's Splinter Cell.

Spin-off studios
In 2013 a number of former Studio Liverpool employees formed two new studios: Firesprite which worked on the visuals of The Playroom for the PlayStation 4, and Playrise Digital who had success with their Table Top Racing games. In September 2021, Sony acquired Firesprite.

XDev
XDev, Sony's external development studio is responsible for managing the development of titles at developers that are outside of Sony's own developer group. It has won 14 British Academy (BAFTA) video game awards and AIAS awards for LittleBigPlanet, 3 BAFTA awards for the Buzz! series and Develop Industry Excellence Awards for MotorStorm and Buzz!.

Games

Games developed or published as Psygnosis

Games developed as SCE Studio Liverpool

See also
 London Studio
 Guerrilla Cambridge
 Evolution Studios
 Bigbig Studios
 Tim Wright

References

External links
 
 

1984 establishments in England
1993 mergers and acquisitions
2012 disestablishments in England
British companies disestablished in 2012
British companies established in 1984
Defunct companies based in Liverpool
Defunct video game companies of the United Kingdom
PlayStation Studios
Video game companies disestablished in 2012
Video game companies established in 1984
Video game development companies
Video game publishers
British subsidiaries of foreign companies